Khindristan or Khindristan may refer to:
Almalı, Khojali, Azerbaijan
Xındırıstan, Azerbaijan